Morristown Airport  is in Morris County, New Jersey, United States, three miles east of downtown Morristown and 27 miles west of Manhattan, New York City. Operated by DM AIRPORTS, LTD, it is in the Whippany section of Hanover. The National Plan of Integrated Airport Systems for 2011–2015 called it a general aviation reliever airport.

During his presidency, President Donald Trump flew into the airport on an Air Force Boeing C-32 operating as Air Force One during his weekend visits and summer vacations at his home at the Trump National Golf Club in Bedminster, New Jersey, which is about 24 miles southwest of the airport.

History

In 1929, it was announced that Morristown, New Jersey would get an airport. The airport would sit on 280 acres of land on the Columbia Meadowlands. The airport opened in the early 1930s, but due to the Great Depression, the activity at the field was relatively slow. In 1933, the Federal Government provided funds for a better airport. Midway through construction, the airport ran out of money.

Morristown Municipal Airport's initial purpose was to serve as the eastern hub for the Zeppelin, but due to the Hindenburg Disaster in 1936, those plans were later scrapped.

During World War Two, Morristown served as a primary training center for the army. The Army became such an economic advantage to the airport that the airport made enough money to purchase and install hangars by the end of the War.

In 1947, the new hangars brought companies to the airport and the city of Morristown. The airport also created a significant population growth. 

In 1969, Judge Joseph Stamler of New Jersey Superior Court issued a 1969 opinion in a case regarding noise from business jets operating at the airport, brought by residents and governments of surrounding municipalities, in which he set a curfew limiting takeoffs and landings during overnight hours. The judge said, "the giants of industry will see the wisdom of slowing the cross-country speed of their important executives, and will take a close, concerned look at the little people of this country" who were dealing with the impact of noise and ticket prices.

Like most of the United States at the time, the 1960-70s became the Jet Age at Morristown. For Morristown, this meant the expansion of the airport to accommodate jet aircraft. Morristown's airport expansion meant a significant extension to its main runway from 4000ft to 5998ft, a new, state-of-the-art control tower, and an instrument landing system (ILS). The airport became known as "the VIP stop." Commercial air traffic became a goal for the airport but was never reached. 

In 2002, several hundred planes were based at the airport, making it one of the busiest General Aviation airports in the United States.

Statistics 

In the year ending August 30, 2012, the airport had 72,702 aircraft operations, an average of 199 per day: 84% general aviation, 15% air taxi, 1% military and <1% airline. In November 2016, there were 194 aircraft based at this airport: 89 single-engine, 17 multi-engine, 81 jet and 7 helicopter.

Facilities 

Control Tower 
The first control tower at the airport went up in 1950. The airport purchased the original, retired wooden tower from Teterboro Airport to control the field throughout the 1950s. However, after a rise in aircraft operations, the 1960s brought a new, modern tower to the field.

Runways 
Runway 23 has a ILS and LOC approach (Instrument Landing System), an RNAV RNP approach, and a GPS RNAV approach (Instrument Approach). Runway 23 also has a MALSR approach lighting system. Runway 5 has an GPS RNAV approach. Runway 5/23 is the preferred noise abatement runway for the airport. 

There are no instrument procedures for this runway.

FBOs 
There are two fixed-base operators (FBOs): Atlantic Aviation and Signature Flight Support.

Morristown Airport is home to multiple based jet charter operators available to the public. It has four flight schools on-site: American Flyers, ATP, Certified Flyers, and NOVA Aviation. Morristown Airport also has a customs facility.

Airlines and destinations

No routes are currently operating due to the departure of Ultimate Air Shuttle, which used to fly to Cincinnati-Lunken.

Charter and Private operators
Despite not being a busy commercial airport, Morristown Municipal has a lot of private and charter operations that arrive and depart every day.

Transient Charters

Airport Based Charters

See also 
 Transportation in New York City
 List of airports in New Jersey

References

External links 
 Morristown Airport, official website
 Morristown Airport (MMU) at New Jersey DOT Airport Directory
 Signature Flight Support and FTC FBO, the fixed-base operators (FBOs)
 Taxi and Car Service at Morristown  Airport, Transportation
 Aerial image as of March 1991 from USGS The National Map
 
 

Airports in New Jersey
Transportation buildings and structures in Morris County, New Jersey
Hanover Township, New Jersey